Lea Krajnc (born 1 April 1993) is a Slovenian handball player for RK Zagorje and the Slovenian national team.

She participated at the 2016 European Women's Handball Championship.

References

1993 births
Living people
Slovenian female handball players
People from Izola
Expatriate handball players in Turkey
Slovenian expatriate sportspeople in Turkey
Zağnos SK (women's handball) players
Competitors at the 2018 Mediterranean Games
Mediterranean Games bronze medalists for Slovenia
Mediterranean Games medalists in handball
21st-century Slovenian women